Endolymph is the fluid contained in the membranous labyrinth of the inner ear. The major cation in endolymph is potassium, with the values of sodium and potassium concentration in the endolymph being 0.91 mM and 154 mM, respectively. It is also called Scarpa's fluid, after Antonio Scarpa.

Structure
The inner ear has two parts: the bony labyrinth and the membranous labyrinth.  The membranous labyrinth is contained within the bony labyrinth, and within the membranous labyrinth is a fluid called endolymph.  Between the outer wall of the membranous labyrinth and the wall of the bony labyrinth is the location of perilymph.

Composition
Perilymph and endolymph have unique ionic compositions suited to their functions in regulating electrochemical impulses of hair cells. The electric potential of endolymph is ~80-90 mV more positive than perilymph due to a higher concentration of K compared to Na.

The main component of this unique extracellular fluid is potassium, which is secreted from the stria vascularis. The high potassium content of the endolymph means that potassium, not sodium, is carried as the de-polarizing electric current in the hair cells. This is known as the mechano-electric transduction (MET) current.

Endolymph has a high positive potential (80–120 mV in the cochlea), relative to other nearby fluids such as perilymph, due to its high concentration of positively charged ions.  It is mainly this electrical potential difference that allows potassium ions to flow into the hair cells during mechanical stimulation of the hair bundle. Because the hair cells are at a negative potential of about -50 mV, the potential difference from endolymph to hair cell is on the order of 150 mV, which is the largest electrical potential difference found in the body.

Function
 Hearing: Cochlear duct: fluid waves in the endolymph of the cochlear duct stimulate the receptor cells, which in turn translate their movement into nerve impulses that the brain perceives as sound.
 Balance: Semicircular canals: angular acceleration of the endolymph in the semicircular canals stimulate the vestibular receptors of the endolymph.  The semicircular canals of both inner ears act in concert to coordinate balance.

Clinical significance
Disruption of the endolymph due to jerky movements (like spinning around or driving over bumps while riding in a car) can cause motion sickness. A condition where the volume of the endolymph is greatly enlarged is called endolymphatic hydrops and has been linked to Ménière's disease.

Additional images

See also
 Dark cell
Perilymph
Stria vascularis
Organ of Corti
Ménière's disease

References

External links
 https://web.archive.org/web/20051030092447/http://oto.wustl.edu/cochlea/res1.htm Longitudinal Flow of Endolymph at wustl.edu

Human head and neck
Ear
Body fluids